The Hellas Open in badminton is an international open held in Greece since 2016 and are thereby one of the most recent international championships in Europe.

Previous winners
The table below gives an overview of the winners at the tournament.

Performances by nation

References

External links
 Hellenic Badminton Federation

Badminton tournaments in Greece
Badminton in Greece
Recurring sporting events established in 2016